Mount Rodica (1966 m) is a peak in the Julian Alps in Slovenia. It is accessible from Vogel Ski Resort above Ukanc in the Municipality of Bohinj.

References

External links 
 Mount Rodica on Geopedia

Mountains of the Julian Alps
One-thousanders of Slovenia